Vacamonte is a place in the Arraiján District in the Province of Panamá Oeste in Panama. In 2010 the population was 41,000.

References

 
Provinces of Panama